The Macau Military Club is a club and restaurant in Sé, Macau, China.

History
The building was originally constructed in 1870 as a private military club. The building was restored in 1995 and reopened as a restaurant.

Events
The club regularly hosts various exhibitions.

See also
 List of tourist attractions in Macau
 Macau Garrison

References

Macau Peninsula
1870 establishments in China
1870 establishments in the Portuguese Empire
19th-century establishments in Macau
Restaurants in Macau
Portuguese colonial architecture in China